The Pawaras or Pavaras are a subtribe of the Bhils found in satpuda pradesh  also called Pávra Bhils, Pávra Náiks and Pávra Kolis. They hold three main festivals: Indraja, Divali and Shimga or Holi.

References

Bhil clans